Gopinath Saha or Gopi Mohan Saha (16 December 1905 — 1 March 1924) was a Bengali activist for Indian independence (from British rule) and member of the Indian independence movement On 12 January 1924, he attempted to assassinate Charles Tegart, a leader in the fight against revolutionary movements and the then head of the Detective Department of Calcutta Police. Saha's attempt failed as he erroneously killed Ernest Day (born 1888), a white civilian who had gone there on official business. Saha was arrested, tried and, on 1 March 1924, hanged, in Alipore Central jail.

He was born in the town of Srirampur, whose erstwhile name was Serampore of undivided Bengal.

References

Revolutionary Movement in India during 1920s and 1930s. Retrieved on 25 May 2008.

1924 deaths
Executed revolutionaries
Revolutionary movement for Indian independence
Indian revolutionaries
Indian assassins
Executed Indian people
People executed by British India by hanging
Failed assassins
Executed assassins
Hindustan Socialist Republican Association
1905 births
Indian independence activists from West Bengal